Colonel William Byrd III (September 6, 1728January 1 or January 2, 1777) was an American planter, politician and military officer who was a member of the House of Burgesses.

Early life

He was son of William Byrd II and Maria Taylor Byrd, and the grandson of William Byrd I.

Career 
Byrd inherited his family's estate of approximately 179,000 acres of land in Virginia and continued their enslaver class, or "planter" prestige as a member of the Virginia House of Burgesses.

He chose to fight in the French and Indian War rather than spend much time in Richmond. In 1756 he was colonel of the Second Virginia Regiment.

William Byrd III had a reputation as a notorious gambler.  He initiated what was said to have been the first major horse race in the New World, involving fellow Virginia planters John Tayloe II, Francis Thornton, and Samuel Ogle & Benjamin Tasker Jr. of Maryland.

After he squandered the Byrd fortune on building a magnificent mansion at Westover Plantation, gambling, and bad investments, Byrd parceled up much of the land he had inherited from his father and sold it off to raise money to pay his debts.  He also sold the enslaved African laborers who had worked on his estate plantation. 

Although his sale of property in assets of land, and enslaved, generated a huge sum. It still was not enough to pay off his debt creditors.  Later, Byrd resorted to a lottery, the prizes of which would come from his estate, Belvidere, at the falls of the James River. However the lottery failed to generate sufficient revenue.

Marriage and family

In 1748, Byrd married Elizabeth Carter, daughter of Robert Carter I, who had recently died. An excellent political match, as her father had been the colony's richest man. Gaining his wealth as a prominent plantation owner, and enslaver. He served in the House of Burgesses and then the colony's Governor's Council (eventually becoming its president by seniority). Together they had five children, 4 sons and 1 daughter. Byrd had repudiated Carter before her death in 1760, which is considered a probable suicide.  Byrd remarried, and fathered ten more by his second wife, Mary Willing, daughter of Charles Willing of Philadelphia.
Despondent and nearly broke, Byrd committed suicide on January 1 or 2, 1777.  He was buried in the cemetery at the old Westover Church.

The 10 children of his second marriage (to Mary Willing) were:

 Maria Horsmanden Byrd
 Evelyn Taylor Byrd
 Charles Willing Byrd (died as child)
 Abby Byrd
 Anne Willing Byrd
 William Boyd Byrd
 Charles Willing Byrd
 Dorothy Byrd (died as child)
 Jane Byrd
 Richard Willing Byrd

References

External links
William Byrd III at History.org

1728 births
1777 deaths
18th-century American politicians
18th-century suicides
American people of English descent
American planters
American politicians who committed suicide
American racehorse owners and breeders
American slave owners
British America army officers
Burials in Virginia
William Byrd III
House of Burgesses members
People of colonial Maryland
People of Virginia in the French and Indian War
Suicides in Virginia